James Elliot Cabot (June 18, 1821 – January 16, 1903) was an American philosopher and author, born in Boston to Samuel Cabot, Jr., and Eliza Cabot.

Education and career
Having received his bachelor's degree from Harvard Law School in 1845, Elliot started a law firm.

He taught philosophy at Harvard and was a transcendentalist and edited the Massachusetts Quarterly Review, beginning in 1848. Cabot was a correspondent of Henry David Thoreau.

Views and publications
Cabot argued that we do not experience space directly, that space is "a system of relations, it cannot be given in any one sensation. [...] Space is a symbol of the general relatedness of objects constructed by thought from data which lie below consciousness." Cabot was of the opinion that the position of something in space was not felt at all, but deduced from perceived relations.

His 2-volume biography of Ralph Waldo Emerson was criticized for its lack of colour. According to the review in The Saturday Review of Politics, Literature, Science, and Art, Cabot "gives abundant materials for forming, correcting, or filling up an idea of Emerson's character, but comparatively little information about the events of a life which appears, indeed, to have been very uneventful."

Family
Cabot and his wife Elizabeth had five sons, the most notable of them being Richard Clarke Cabot (1868–1939), a physician who advanced clinical hematology, was an innovator in teaching methods, and a pioneer in social work.

References

External links
Papers, 1786–1945. Schlesinger Library, Radcliffe Institute, Harvard University.
Massachusetts Quarterly Review, Ralph Waldo Emerson, Theodore Parker, James Elliot Cabot

1821 births
1903 deaths
American biographers
American male biographers
19th-century American philosophers
Harvard Law School alumni
Cabot family
19th-century male writers